Michael S. Heiser (February 14, 1963 – February 20, 2023) was an American Old Testament scholar and Christian author with training in ancient history, Semitic languages, and the Hebrew Bible from the University of Pennsylvania and the University of Wisconsin–Madison. His expertise and work focused on the nature of the spiritual realm in the Bible and about spiritual matters more generally, and he wrote more than ten books on these subjects since 2010. He served as Executive Director of the School of Ministry at Celebration Church in Jacksonville, Florida, and as a professor at Liberty University and Midwestern Baptist Theological Seminary. He ran The Naked Bible podcast and Miqlat, a ministry to disseminate his scholarship. He has additionally been active in media productions around his area of interest, and in response to popular presentations relating to spiritual matters (such as material in the Stranger Things series, and in rebutting ancient astronaut conjectures).

Early life and education
Heiser was born on February 14, 1963, and raised in Lebanon, Pennsylvania. He received an MA in Ancient History from the University of Pennsylvania, and an MA and PhD in the Hebrew Bible and Semitic Languages from the University of Wisconsin–Madison (with a minor in Classical studies).

Research interests
Heiser's area of expertise is the nature of the spiritual realm in the Bible, namely the "Divine Council" (e.g., in Psalm 82) and the hierarchy of spiritual order in the Bible. In many of his works, Heiser stressed the overarching importance and role of the Divine Council in the Old Testament, and Kevin Bauder, Research Professor of Systematic Theology at Central Baptist Theological Seminary, has referred to Heiser as the "most prominent evangelical defender" of the divine council interpretation of Psalm 82; he notes that Heiser "has become a[n]... evangelist for the divine council theory, giving it wide exposure in popular books and articles, and defending it..." through his blogging and other internet activities.

Criticism of ancient astronaut arguments
Heiser spoke out critically against proponents of pseudoscientific ancient astronaut conjectures, especially as popularized by Zechariah Sitchin. Heiser appeared in Ancient Aliens Debunked as an expert on the Hebrew Bible and Ancient Near Eastern texts.

Career

Beginning in 2015, Heiser published at least ten books regarding the meaning of various biblical concepts, and on other topics related to popular understandings of spirituality; in addition, he produced at least two works of fiction, in the early 2010s. Until 2019, Heiser was scholar-in-residence at Faithlife Corporation. As of 2018 he was Executive Director of the School of Ministry at Celebration Church in Jacksonville, Florida, and a distance-learning professor at Liberty University and Midwestern Baptist Theological Seminary. As of that date, Heiser produced the podcast, The Naked Bible, and a ministry called Miqlat, dedicated to the production and dissemination of his content.

Heiser appeared in the 2018 documentary film Fragments of Truth, and in the 2019 documentary film The Unseen Realm. In 2019 Heiser released the book The World Turned Upside Down: Finding the Gospel in Stranger Things, referencing the Netflix series Stranger Things as analogies to Christian theology.

Personal life and death
In 2020, Heiser was diagnosed with pancreatic cancer. On January 4, 2023, his wife Drenna, posting on his Instagram page with an accompanying picture of the hospitalized Heiser, noted that he had been admitted for severe anemia, that physicians had stabilized him and were seeking to determine a source of blood loss. On January 22, he announced on his Facebook page that he was "at the end of the road in the late stage (4) of a very aggressive pancreatic cancer". Heiser succumbed to his illness on February 20, just a week after his 60th birthday.

Selected works

Further reading
  Access to the >400 entries at Google Scholar (G.S.), including citations for the Heiser graduate dissertation at Wisconsin, most Heiser books, and many scholarly papers.

References

External links
Michael Heiser homepage
Dr. Michael S. Heiser on YouTube
SitchinIsWrong.com
Michael's work blog

1963 births
2023 deaths 
American biblical scholars
Deaths from pancreatic cancer
Old Testament scholars
University of Pennsylvania alumni
University of Wisconsin–Madison alumni
Bob Jones University alumni
Midwestern Baptist Theological Seminary faculty
Liberty University faculty
People from Lebanon, Pennsylvania